Nitrosoproline is a nitroso derivative of the amino acid proline.

References

IARC Group 3 carcinogens
Amino acid derivatives
Nitrosamines